Elena Dmitriyevna Novikova-Belova (Russian: Елена Дмитриевна Новикова-Белова, née Novikova, born 28 July 1947) is a retired Russian foil fencer. She competed at the 1968, 1972, 1976 and 1980 Olympics in the individual and team events and won four gold, one silver and one bronze medal, becoming the first female fencer to win four Olympic gold medals. She nearly won a fifth gold in 1976, but lost her last pool match to the last-placed fencer. Belova also won eight world titles, individually in 1969, and with the Soviet team in 1970–1979.

Shortly before the 1968 Olympics she married Vyacheslav Belov, a future world champion in modern pentathlon, and changed her last name from Novikova to Belova. She retired after the 1980 Olympics, and gave birth in 1987, aged 40. Her second husband, composer Valery Ivanov, devoted a waltz to her.

In 1970 Belova graduated from the Minsk institute of Pedagogy, she holds a PhD in this discipline. In 1997 she was awarded the Olympic Order in Silver, and in 2007 the Pierre de Coubertin Medal.

References

External links

1947 births
Living people
People from Sovetskaya Gavan
Russian female foil fencers
Soviet female foil fencers
Olympic fencers of the Soviet Union
Fencers at the 1968 Summer Olympics
Fencers at the 1972 Summer Olympics
Fencers at the 1976 Summer Olympics
Fencers at the 1980 Summer Olympics
Olympic gold medalists for the Soviet Union
Olympic medalists in fencing
Olympic silver medalists for the Soviet Union
Olympic bronze medalists for the Soviet Union
Recipients of the Pierre de Coubertin medal
Medalists at the 1968 Summer Olympics
Medalists at the 1972 Summer Olympics
Medalists at the 1976 Summer Olympics
Medalists at the 1980 Summer Olympics
Universiade medalists in fencing
Universiade silver medalists for the Soviet Union
Sportspeople from Khabarovsk Krai